Ferenc Török (born 3 August 1935) is a Hungarian modern pentathlete and Olympic champion.

Olympics
Ferenc Török received an individual gold medal at the 1964 Summer Olympics in Tokyo, and a bronze medal with the Hungarian team. He received a gold medal at the 1968 Summer Olympics in Mexico City with the Hungarian team.

Awards

Török was elected Hungarian Sportsman of the Year 1964, and Hungarian Coach of the year 1989.

References

1935 births
Living people
Hungarian male modern pentathletes
Olympic modern pentathletes of Hungary
Modern pentathletes at the 1964 Summer Olympics
Modern pentathletes at the 1968 Summer Olympics
Olympic gold medalists for Hungary
Olympic bronze medalists for Hungary
Hungarian sports coaches
Olympic medalists in modern pentathlon
Sportspeople from Budapest
World Modern Pentathlon Championships medalists
Medalists at the 1968 Summer Olympics
Medalists at the 1964 Summer Olympics